Riccardo Bonadio (born 13 July 1993) is an Italian tennis player.

Bonadio has a career high ATP singles ranking of 171 achieved on 20 February 2023. He also has a career high doubles ranking of 278 achieved on 21 March 2022.

Bonadio has won 1 ATP Challenger doubles title at the 2021 Antalya Challenger III with Giovanni Fonio.

He made his ATP debut at the 2023 Chile Open in Santiago after qualifying for the main draw. He recorded his first ATP win defeating Daniel Elahi Galan.

Challenger and Futures/World Tennis Tour Finals

Singles: 20 (10–10)

Doubles

References

External links
 
 

1993 births
Living people
Italian male tennis players